Antsiranana, named Diego-Suárez prior to 1975, is a city in the far north of Madagascar. Antsiranana is the capital of Diana Region. It had an estimated population of 115,015 in 2013.

History
The bay and city originally used the name Diego-Suárez, named after Diogo Soares, a Portuguese navigator who visited the bay in 1543–44.

In the 1880s, the bay was coveted by France, which desired it as a coaling station for steamships. After the first Franco-Hova War, Queen Ranavalona III signed a treaty on December 17, 1885, granting France a protectorate over the bay and surrounding territory, as well as the islands of Nosy-Be and Ste. Marie de Madagascar.

The colony's administration was subsumed into that of Madagascar in 1896. The Second Pacific Squadron of Imperial Russia anchored and was resupplied at Diego-Suárez on its way to the Battle of Tsushima in 1905.

In 1942, Diego-Suárez was the primary objective of Operation Ironclad, the starting point of the Allied invasion and capture of Madagascar. The Allies were concerned that Japan would pressure Vichy France into granting use of Madagascar, as they had with French Indo-China during the previous year, and determined that the island should not be made a base for the interception of Allied shipping. Diego-Suárez, with its superb harbour and a concentration of government officials, was selected as the initial invasion point. The Japanese responded with an attack by midget submarines on the British naval forces in the harbour, damaging the battleship  and sinking the oil tanker British Loyalty.

France continued to operate a military base in the city following Malagasy independence in 1960.  Between 1973 and 1975, French forces were withdrawn.

Geography

Climate 
Antsiranana has a tropical savannah climate (Aw) with long, hot summer-like weather that lasts year round cut into two seasons; a wet season which lasts from December to March and a dry season which lasts the rest of the year with rainfall being uncommon but not impossible.

Transport

Antsiranana is situated on Antsiranana Bay, one of the largest deep-water harbours in the Indian Ocean, but the remote location, and, until recently, a bad road to the south, rendered it unimportant for freight traffic. Arrachart Airport provides communication primarily with other parts of Madagascar.

Postage stamps

Education 
The University of Antsiranana was founded in 1976.

Lycée Français Diego Suarez, or Lycée Français Sadi-Carnot, is a French international school in Antsiranana. Historically it was the Collège français Sadi Carnot.

Places of worship    
Among the places of worship, they are predominantly Christian churches and temples : Church of Jesus Christ in Madagascar (World Communion of Reformed Churches), Malagasy Lutheran Church (Lutheran World Federation), Assemblies of God, Association of Bible Baptist Churches in Madagascar (Baptist World Alliance), Roman Catholic Diocese of Antsiranana (Catholic Church seated in the Cathedral of St. Matthew). There are also Muslim mosques.

In popular culture
The climactic scenes of the alternative history novel The Madagaskar Plan are set in the city.

See also
 Antsiranana Bay
 Decauville railway at Diégo Suarez

References

External links
 
 Diego Suárez review (madacamp.com)

Cities in Madagascar
Populated places in Diana Region
Regional capitals in Madagascar
Former French colonies
1885 establishments in the French colonial empire